Lynn Kurland is a best-selling American author of historical, time travel, and fantasy romance novels.  The characters in most of her books all belong to one of three extended families (Macleod, McKinnon, de Piaget) and her love scenes are not as explicit as many other popular romances. She is a recipient of the RITA Award.

Biography
Lynn Kurland is an only child.  Her first attempts at writing came when she was five years old and living in Hawaii.  Her series of short stories featured a young man who encountered all sorts of trouble.  After she moved to the mainland U.S. a short time later, she put aside her interest in writing to focus on music. Kurland always loved to read, though, and in college was introduced to romance novels.  She soon decided to write her own novel.

Stardust of Yesterday was published in 1996, winning two RITA awards.  To date, she has published twenty-nine full-length novels with a regular schedule of a Nine Kingdoms fantasy novel every January and a time-travel/paranormal every April.  She has also published eight novellas, one of which won a RITA.  She is known for her characters and the way their lives intertwine through all of her novels.  It is this skill that has kept all of her books from going out of print.

Kurland's novels have appeared on The New York Times Bestseller List, USAToday Bestseller List, The New York Times Extended Bestseller List, the Amazon Top 100, and the Barnes & Noble, Waldenbooks, and B. Dalton Bestsellers lists.  She has won three RITA awards and was a finalist for a fourth.

Kurland is trained as a classical musician.  She plays cello in a quartet, plays the piano when asked, and enjoys singing in public.

Bibliography

Macleod, McKinnon, de Piaget Novels
Stardust of Yesterday (1996) Kendrick de Piaget and Genevieve Buchanan
A Dance Through Time (1996) James MacLeod and Elizabeth Smith
This Is All I Ask (1997) Christopher of Blackmour and Gillian of Warewick
The Very Thought of You (1998) Alexander Smith and Margaret of Falconberg
Another Chance to Dream (1998) Rhys de Piaget and Gwennelyn of Segrave
The More I See You (1999) Richard of Burwyck and Jessica Blakely
If I Had You (2000) Robin de Piaget and Anne of Fenwyck
My Heart Stood Still (2001) Thomas MacLeod McKinnon and Iolanthe MacLeod
From This Moment On (2002) Colin of Berkhamshire and Alienore of Solonge
A Garden in the Rain (2003) Patrick MacLeod and Madelyn Phillips
Dreams of Stardust (2005) Jackson Alexander Kilchurn IV and Amanda de Piaget
Much Ado in the Moonlight (2006) Connor MacDougal and Victoria McKinnon
To Kiss In the Shadows (2006) (A novella originally published in TAPESTRY) Jason of Artane and Lianna of Grasleigh
When I Fall in Love (2007) Nicholas de Piaget and Jennifer McKinnon
With Every Breath (2008) Robert Cameron and Sunshine Phillips
Till There Was You (2009) Zachary Smith and Mary de Piaget
One Enchanted Evening (2010) Montgomery de Piaget and Persephone Alexander
One Magic Moment (2011) Tess Alexander and John de Piaget
All For You  (April 24, 2012) Peaches Alexander and Stephen de Piaget
Roses in Moonlight (April 30, 2013) Derrick Cameron and Samantha Drummond
Dreams of Lilacs (April 29, 2014) Isabelle de Piaget and Gervase de Seger
Stars in Your Eyes (November 24, 2015) Phillip de Piaget and Imogen Maxwell
Ever My Love (April 4, 2017) Nathaniel MacLeod and Emmaline Baxter

Macleod, McKinnon, de Piaget Short Stories
"The Gift of Christmas Past" in THE CHRISTMAS CAT (1996) (with Julie Beard, Jo Beverley, Barbara Bretton) Miles dePiaget and Abigail Garrett
"Three Wise Ghosts" in CHRISTMAS SPIRIT (1997) (with Elizabeth Bevarly, Casey Claybourne and Jenny Lykins) Gideon dePiaget and Megan MacLeod McKinnon
"And the Groom Wore Tulle" in VEILS OF TIME (1999) (with Angie Ray, Maggie Shayne and Ingrid Weaver) Ian MacLeod and Jane Fergusson
"The Icing on the Cake" in OPPOSITES ATTRACT (2000) (with Elizabeth Bevarly, Emily Carmichael and Elda Minger) Samuel MacLeod and Sydney Kincaid
"The Traveller" in A KNIGHT'S VOW (2001) (with Glynnis Campbell, Patricia Potter and Deborah Simmons) Sir William dePiaget and Julianna Nelson
"To Kiss in the Shadows" TAPESTRY (2002) (with Madeline Hunter, Sherrilyn Kenyon and Karen Marie Moning)

Novella Collections
Love Came Just In Time: "The Gift of Christmas Past" Miles and Abigail & "Three Wise Ghosts" Gideon and Megan & "And the Groom Wore Tulle" Ian and Jane & "The Icing on the Cake" Sam and Sydney (2001)

Nine Kingdoms Stories"The Tale of Two Swords" in TO WEAVE A WEB OF MAGIC (2004) (with Claire Delacroix, Patricia A. McKillip and Sharon Shinn)"A Whisper of Spring" in THE QUEEN IN WINTER (2006) (with Claire Delacroix, Sarah Monette and Sharon Shinn)Star of the Morning (2006) Morgan of Melksham and Mochriadhemiach of Neroche, book 1 in their trilogyThe Mage's Daughter (2008) Morgan of Melksham and Mochriadhemiach of Neroche, book 2 in their trilogyPrincess of the Sword (2009) Morgan of Melksham and Mochriadhemiach of Neroche, book 3 in their trilogyTapestry of Spells (2010) Sarah and Ruith, book 1 in their trilogySpellweaver (2011) Sarah and Ruith, book 2 in their trilogyGift of Magic (2012) Sarah and Ruith, book 3 in their trilogyDreamspinner (2013) Aisling and Runach, book 1 in their trilogyRiver of Dreams (2014) Aisling and Runach, book 2 in their trilogyDreamer's Daughter (2015) Aisling and Runach, book 3 in their trilogy
"The White Spell" (2016) Acair and Léirsinn, book 1
"The Dreamer's Song" (2017) Acair and Léirsinn, book 2
"The Prince of Souls" (2019) Acair and Léirsinn, book 3

Awards

Romance Writers of America RITA Award for Best First Novel, Stardust of YesterdayRomance Writers of America RITA Award for Best Paranormal, Stardust of YesterdayRomance Writers of America RITA Award for Best Romantic Novella, To Kiss in the Shadows (from the Tapestry anthology)
Romance Writers of America finalist for RITA Award for Best Long Historical, Another Chance to Dream1999 PEARL award for Best Time Travel, The More I See YouRomantic Times Reviewers' Choice Award for Best Contemporary Fantasy Romance, Stardust of YesterdayRomantic Times Bookstores that Care award for Best Paranormal Romance, Stardust of YesterdayRomantic Times Reviewers' Choice Award for Best Medieval Historical Romance, Another Chance to DreamRomantic Times Bookstores that Care Award for Best Time Travel, The Very Thought of YouRomantic Times 1999 Career Achievement Award for Historical Fantasy
Romantic Times 1999 Reviewers' Choice Finalist for Best Historical Time Travel, The More I See YouRomantic Times Bookstores that Care Finalist for Best Historical, This is All I AskRomantic Times Bookstores that Care Finalist for Best Time Travel, A Dance Through Time''

Sources

External links
Lynn Kurland Official Website
 

Living people
20th-century American novelists
21st-century American novelists
American romantic fiction writers
RITA Award winners
American women novelists
Latter Day Saints from Hawaii
Women romantic fiction writers
20th-century American women writers
21st-century American women writers
Year of birth missing (living people)